Mario Traxl (born 30 May 1964) is an Austrian former cyclist. He won the Austrian National Road Race Championships in 1989 and 1994. He also rode in two events at the 1988 Summer Olympics.

References

External links
 

1964 births
Living people
Austrian male cyclists
People from Mödling District
Cyclists at the 1988 Summer Olympics
Olympic cyclists of Austria
Sportspeople from Lower Austria